Omid Mansouri (born 22 April 1998) is an Iranian footballer who plays as a centre-back for Fajr Sepasi in the Persian Gulf Pro League

References

Living people
1998 births
Iranian footballers
Association football central defenders
Fajr Sepasi players
People from Bojnord